Charlotte Hall Historic District is a national historic district in Charlotte Hall, St. Mary's County, Maryland. It encompasses a small village along "Old Route 5." It includes 13 recorded buildings and sites of historic and/or architectural interest as well as the main campus of the Charlotte Hall Military Academy.

It was added to the National Register of Historic Places in 1975.

Gallery

References

External links
, including photo dated 2002, at Maryland Historical Trust
Boundary Map of the Charlotte Hall Historic District, St. Mary's County, at Maryland Historical Trust

Historic districts in St. Mary's County, Maryland
Historic districts on the National Register of Historic Places in Maryland
Historic American Buildings Survey in Maryland
National Register of Historic Places in St. Mary's County, Maryland